Max Bonner (1917–1996) was an Australian tennis player. He was originally from Western Australia, but moved to Victoria in the 1940s. He was singles champion of Western Australia in 1941. He began playing tennis at an early age, as his parents were told to make sure he went outside for health reasons. Aged 23 in September 1940, Bonner became a sergeant in the R. A. A. F. After serving in the Darwin raids, he was discharged on medical grounds. He was a popular player and very agile around the court, but was prone to being erratic. 
Bonner made his debut at the 1936 Australian championships and lost in round one to Lionel Brodie. In 1937 he lost in round one to Frank Bennett. In 1938 he lost in round one to Adrian Quist. In 1939 he lost in round two to Vivian McGrath. In 1940 he lost in round two to Bill Sidwell. At the Australian championships in 1946, Bonner had the best win of his career against veteran former champion Jack Crawford. The match contained many long gruelling baseline rallies and in the end Bonner wore out his older opponent. Bonner then lost to Quist in the quarter finals. In 1947 he lost in round two to Brodie. In 1948 and 1949 he lost early to Sidwell. Then Bonner became a professional tennis coach.

References

1917 births
Australian male tennis players
Year of death missing
Tennis people from Western Australia
Royal Australian Air Force personnel of World War II
Royal Australian Air Force airmen